Hebius lacrima, the crying keelback,  is a species of snake of the family Colubridae. The snake is found in India and China.

References 

lacrima
Reptiles of India
Reptiles of China
Reptiles described in 2019